Shi Na (born February 17, 1981 in Xintai, Shandong) is a Chinese athletics race walker.  She represented her country at the 20 km race walk event at the 2008 Summer Olympics.

Achievements

Personal best
2004 World Cup - 1st team walk

References
http://2008teamchina.olympic.cn/index.php/personview/personsen/4865

1981 births
Living people
Chinese female racewalkers
Olympic athletes of China
Athletes (track and field) at the 2008 Summer Olympics
People from Tai'an
Athletes from Shandong